Minuscule 133 (in the Gregory-Aland numbering), δ150 (Soden), is a Greek minuscule manuscript of the New Testament, on parchment leaves. Palaeographically it has been assigned to the 11th century. It has marginalia.

Description 

The codex contains the text of the New Testament except Book of Revelation, on 232 parchment leaves (size ). The text is written in one column per page, 29 lines per page (size of the text 15 by 10.3 cm), in black ink.

The text of the Gospels is also divided according another to the smaller Ammonian Sections (in Mark 233, last numbered section in 16:8). It has no references to the Eusebian Canons.

The order of books: Gospels, Acts, Catholic epistles, and Pauline epistles.

Text 
The Greek text of the codex is a representative of the Byzantine text-type. Hermann von Soden classified it to the textual family Kx. Aland placed it in Category V.

According to the Claremont Profile Method it belongs to the textual group Π473.

History 

The manuscript was examined by Birch about 1782. C. R. Gregory saw it in 1886.

It is currently housed at the Vatican Library (Vat. gr. 363), at Rome.

See also 

 List of New Testament minuscules
 Biblical manuscript
 Textual criticism

References

Further reading 

 

Greek New Testament minuscules
11th-century biblical manuscripts
Manuscripts of the Vatican Library